Busche is a German surname. Notable people with the surname include:

Elizabeth Busche (1992–2012), American curler
F. Enzio Busche (1930–2020), German Mormon missionary
Heinz Busche (born 1951), West German bobsledder
Matthew Busche (born 1985), American cyclist

See also
Hermann von dem Busche (1468–1534), German writer

German-language surnames